The siege of Tripoli lasted from 1102 until July 12, 1109. It took place on the site of the present day Lebanese city of Tripoli, in the aftermath of the First Crusade. It led to the establishment of the fourth crusader state, the County of Tripoli.

Background
After the capture of Antioch (June 1098) and the destruction of Ma'arrat al-Numan (January 13, 1099), the Syrian emirs were terrified of the advancing crusaders and quickly handed over their cities to the Franks. On January 14, Sultan ibn Munqidh, emir of Shaizar, dispatched an embassy to Raymond IV of Toulouse, one of the leaders of the crusade, to offer provisions and food for men and horses, as well as guides to Jerusalem. In February, the emir of Homs, Janah ad-Dawla, who had fought bravely at the siege of Antioch, offered horses to Raymond. The qadi of Tripoli, Jalal al-Mulk, from the Banu Ammar, sent rich gifts and invited the Franks to send an embassy to his city. The ambassadors marvelled at the splendors of the city, and an alliance was concluded. The crusades moved on to Arqa, which they besieged from February 14 to May 13, before continuing south to Jerusalem; they did not attack Tripoli or any other possessions of the Banu Ammar.

Raymond returns to Tripoli
The siege of Jerusalem was a success and led to the foundation of the Kingdom of Jerusalem. Most crusaders returned home afterwards; a second movement set out, encouraged by the success of the First Crusade, but it was mostly annihilated by the Seljuk Turks in Anatolia. Raymond participated in this crusade as well, and returned to Syria after escaping from his defeat at the hands of Kilij Arslan I in Anatolia. He had with him only three hundred men. Fakhr al-Mulk, qadi of Tripoli, was not as accommodating to Raymond as his predecessor had been, and called for assistance from Duqaq of Damascus and the governor of Homs. However, the troops from Damascus and Homs defected once they reached Tripoli, and the qadi was defeated at the beginning of April, losing seven thousand men. Raymond could not take Tripoli itself, but captured Tortosa, which became the base of all future operations against Tripoli.

The siege
The following year, Raymond, with the aid of Byzantine engineers, constructed Mons Peregrinus, "Pilgrim's mountain" or "Qalaat Saint-Gilles" ("fortress of Saint-Gilles"), in order to block Tripoli's access inland. With the Genoese Hugh Embriaco, Raymond also seized Gibelet. After the Battle of Harran in 1104, Fakhr al-Mulk asked Sokman, the former Ortoqid governor of Jerusalem, to intervene; Sokman marched into Syria but was forced to return home. 

Fakhr al-Mulk then attacked Mons Peregrinus in September, 1104, killing many of the Franks and burning down one wing of the fortress. Raymond himself was badly wounded, and died five months later in February, 1105. He was replaced as leader by his nephew William-Jordan, count of Cerdanya. On his deathbed, Raymond had reached an agreement with the qadi: if he would stop attacking the fortress, the crusaders would stop impeding Tripolitanian trade and merchandise. The qadi accepted.

In 1108, it became more and more difficult to bring food to the besieged by land. Many citizens sought to flee to Homs, Tyre, and Damascus. The nobles of the city, who had betrayed the city to the Franks by showing them how it was being resupplied with food, were executed in the crusader camp. Fakhr al-Mulk, left to wait for help from the Seljuk sultan Mehmed I, went to Baghdad at the end of March with five hundred troops and many gifts. He passed through Damascus, now governed by Toghtegin after the death of Duqaq, and was welcomed with open arms. In Baghdad, the sultan received him with great spectacle, but had no time for Tripoli while there was a succession dispute in Mosul. Fakhr al-Mulk returned to Damascus in August, where he learned Tripoli had been handed over to Sharaf ad-Dawla ibn Abi al-Tayyib, wali of al-Afdal Shahanshah, vizier of Egypt, by the nobles, who were tired of waiting for him to return. 

The next year, the Franks gathered in force outside Tripoli, led by Baldwin I of Jerusalem, Baldwin II of Edessa, Tancred, regent of Antioch, William-Jordan, and Raymond IV's eldest son Bertrand of Toulouse, who had recently arrived with fresh Genoan, Pisan and Provençal troops. Tripoli waited in vain for reinforcements from Egypt. 

A compromise decided in the course of a dispute beneath the walls of the city, and arbitrated by Baldwin of Jerusalem, allowed the city to be captured: the County of Tripoli would be divided between the two claimants, William-Jordan, as a vassal of the Principality of Antioch, and Bertrand, as a vassal of Jerusalem. 

The city crumbled on July 12, and was sacked by the crusaders. One hundred thousand volumes of the Dar-em-Ilm library were deemed "impious" and burned. The Egyptian fleet arrived eight hours too late. Most of the inhabitants were enslaved, the others were deprived of their possessions and expelled. Bertrand, Raymond IV's illegitimate son, had William-Jordan assassinated in 1110 and claimed two-thirds of the city for himself, with the other third falling to the Genoans. Thus Tripoli became a crusader state; the rest of the Mediterranean coast had already fallen to the crusaders or would pass to them within the next few years, with the capture of Sidon in 1110 and Tyre in 1124.

References

Sources
Mills, C. 1844. The History of the Crusades: For the Recovery and Possession of the Holy Land. Lea & Blanchard, p. 97. No ISBN.
Michaud, J.F. 1852. History of the Crusades. Translated by William Robson p. 287. No ISBN. 
 
Archer, T.A., Kingsford, C.L. and H.E. Watts. 1894. The Story of the Crusades. Putnam, pp. 133, 155-158. No ISBN.

External links
 Lebanon and The Crusades

Tripoli
County of Tripoli
1100s conflicts
1100s in Asia
1102 in Asia
1109 in Asia
Tripoli
Tripoli
History of Tripoli, Lebanon